The Ensor Award (for the first two years Vlaamse Filmprijzen) is an accolade presented by the Ensor Academy of Belgium to recognize cinematic achievement in the film industry and is the highest film honour in the Flemish speaking part of the country. Named after James Ensor, it is the successor of the Joseph Plateau Award that honoured films from the entire country. Since its discontinuation, the Magritte Awards are given to French speaking movies, while the Ensors honour Flemish productions.

The trophy was created by Ostend artist Yves Velter from Ostend. It is given out at the Ostend Film Festival in September. At the ninth edition, two films tied for the top prize as best film. The tenth Ensor Awards ceremony was held on September 14, 2019 and saw the film Girl dominating by winning eight trophies including best film.

The nominees are decided by a jury panel. While the winners are voted by the entire board of Ensor Academie, which consists of members from the film industry. In 2018 categories for achievement in television were introduced.

Categories

Current awards

 Best Film: since 2010
 Best Director: since 2010
 Best Actor in a Leading Role: since 2010
 Best Actress in a Leading Role: since 2010
 Best Screenplay: Since 2010
 Best Cinematography: Since 2011
 Best Production Design: Since 2011
 Best Editing: Since 2011
 Best Music: Since 2011
 Best Co-Production: Since 2011

 Best Documentary: Since 2012
 Best Short Film: Since 2012
 Best Animated Short: Since 2012
 Best Youth Film: Since 2016
 Best TV Series: Since 2017
 Best Screenplay - TV Series: Since 2017
 Best Direction - TV Series: Since 2017
 Best Actor - TV Series: Since 2017
 Best Actress - TV Series: Since 2017
 Best TV Documentary: Since 2017

Retired awards
 Best Debut: 2010 to 2018
 Best Actor in a Supporting Role: 2010 to 2017
 Best Actress in a Supporting Role: 2010 to 2017
 Best Costume Design: 2011 to 2017

Awards ceremonies
The following is a listing of all Magritte Awards ceremonies.

See also

Magritte Award (Waloon equivalent)
Joseph Plateau Award

References

External links
 
 

Belgian film awards
Awards established in 2010
2010 establishments in Belgium